Omphalotus illudens, commonly known as the eastern jack-o'lantern mushroom, is a large, orange mushroom that is often found in clumps on decaying stumps, buried roots, or at the base of hardwood trees in eastern North America.  Its gills often exhibit a weak green bioluminescence when fresh. This green glow has been mentioned in several journal articles, which state that the phenomenon can persist up to 40-50 hours after the mushroom has been picked. It is believed that this display serves to attract insects to the mushroom’s gills during nighttime, which can then distribute its spores across a wider area.

Omphalotus illudens is sometimes confused with edible chanterelles, but can be distinguished by its thicker, fleshier appearance, tendency to form large clusters, and clearly separated caps when young. Unlike chanterelles, the Eastern Jack-o’-lantern is poisonous to humans when eaten, whether raw or cooked, and typically causes vomiting, cramps, and diarrhea. Although some older literature claims the name is synonymous with Omphalotus olearius, phylogenetic analysis confirms the two as distinct species.

Toxicity
The poisonous chemical compounds illudin S and illudin M were isolated from Omphalotus illudens. In addition to their antibacterial and antifungal effects, illudins appear to be the cause of human toxicity when these mushrooms are eaten raw or cooked. Muscarine has also been indirectly implicated in toxicity, but modern studies to demonstrate its presence in O. illudens are needed.

The cytotoxic effect of illudin is of interest for treating some cancers, but illudin itself is too poisonous to use directly so it must first be chemically modified. Inside human cells, illudin S reacts with DNA and creates a type of DNA damage that blocks transcription. This block can only be relieved by a repair system called nucleotide excision repair. Damage in non-transcribed DNA areas is left unrepaired by the cell. This property was exploited by the company MGI Pharma to develop an illudin-derivative called Irofulven for use as a cancer treatment. Its application is still in the experimental phase.

Gallery

See also
List of bioluminescent fungi
Omphalotus olivascens

References

Bioluminescent fungi
illudens
Poisonous fungi